The 1977–78 Divizia A was the sixtieth season of Divizia A, the top-level football league of Romania.

Teams

League table

Results

Top goalscorers

Champion squad

See also 

 1977–78 Divizia B
 1977–78 Divizia C
 1977–78 County Championship

References

Liga I seasons
Romania
1977–78 in Romanian football